Paung Laung Stadium is an association football stadium at Pyinmana, Naypyidaw, Myanmar. It has a capacity of 15,000, and is the home stadium of Nay Pyi Taw F.C.

External links
Paung Laung Stadium, soccerway.com

Football venues in Myanmar
Buildings and structures in Naypyidaw